Tell Wardeen is an archaeological site 9 km northwest of Baalbek, 6 km east southeast of Boudaye in the Beqaa Mohafazat (Governorate) in Lebanon. It dates at least to the early Bronze Age.

References

Baalbek District
Bronze Age sites in Lebanon